Olga Aleksandra Sipowicz (née Ostrowska; 8 June 1951 – 28 July 2018), also known by the mononym of Kora, was a Polish rock vocalist and songwriter. She was the lead singer of the rock band Maanam from 1976 to 2008. Jackowska also provided the voice of Edna Mode in the Polish dubs of both Incredibles films.

In 1971, Jackowska married rock musician Marek Jackowski, with whom she later founded the band Maanam. They divorced in 1984, and she gained custody of their children. In 2013, Jackowska married Kamil Sipowicz, writer, poet, and artist.

Jackowska was diagnosed with ovarian cancer in 2013, and she died from the disease on 28 July 2018, aged 67.

Discography

References 

1951 births
2018 deaths
Musicians from Kraków
Polish pop singers
Polish rock singers
Polish lyricists
20th-century Polish women singers
21st-century Polish women singers
21st-century Polish singers
Deaths from ovarian cancer
Deaths from cancer in Poland